National Highway 54 (NH 54) is a National Highway in India. This is highway runs in the Indian state of Punjab Haryana & Rajasthan starts near Pathankot and ends at Kenchiya Hanumangarh district in Rajasthan, near NH 62.

See also 
 List of National Highways in India (by Highway Number)
 List of National Highways in India
 National Highways Development Project

References

External links 

 NH 54 on OpenStreetMap

National highways in India
Transport in Pathankot